Nodi Swamy Navirodu Heege (English : Look Sir, this is the way we are) was a 1983 Indian Kannada language film directed by and starring Shankar Nag. It also stars Master Manjunath ("Chottey"), Arundhati Nag, and Ramesh Bhat.

The music was composed by noted composer G. K. Venkatesh. The title song became a chartbuster. This is one of the all-time super hit title songs which fits for all age. Master singer Bhimsen Joshi sang in the film on insistence of G. K. Venkatesh. His song "Bhagyada Lakshmi Baramma" was the highlight of the film. Also, an interesting point is, Shankar Nag has shown the western culture in Bengaluru in 1983 itself and how the people of Karnataka have an advanced sense of thought.

Plot
Mysore Matha (Shankar Nag) is a happy go lucky person who lives life to the fullest even though he is unemployed. He is very helpful to his neighbours and is loved by one and all. Kallesh Nuggehalli (Ramesh Bhat) is the best friend of Mysore Matha. Kallesh falls in love with Jaya Jahagirdar (Arundhati Nag) and persuades Mysore to arrange for a meeting with her.

Jaya also falls in love with Kallesh, however, Jay's father (Loknath) who is a retired Bank Manager is very sceptical of Kallesh and rejects him. Jaya goes against her parent's wishes and married Kallesh. Kallesh and Jaya lead a happy life but daily chores causes tension between them and they begin to fight. To add to the fuel, Kallesh's mother (Tara Mallya) shows up at their home and decides to stay for a few months. Kallesh's mother being a very orthodox religious woman is very particular about her routine, her food and everything begins to taunt Jaya at every step. Jaya tries to explain to Kallesh about the problems she is facing with his mother, but Kallesh retaliates saying that his mother means everything to him and she can leave his house if she cannot adjust. Jaya leaves and seeks refuge in a women's hostel.

Mysore is completely unaware of these developments. Once he learns, he is furious with Kallesh for having chased Jaya away. Mysore reconciles both Kallesh and Jaya and they both agree to work out their problems. They both promise to Mysore that whatever happens in the future, they would always remember their love for each other and work out their problems and not to break up ever again.

Master Manjunath plays Chottey, an orphan boy leaving in the same housing complex as Mysore. Mysore loves the boy very much and Chottey is like a side kick to him always by his side.

Cast
 Shankar Nag as Mysore Matha
 Ramesh Bhat as Kallesh Nuggehalli
 Arundhati Nag as Jaya Jahagirdar
 Ananth Nag as Mysore Matha's brother (Special appearance)
 Lakshmi as Aparna (Special appearance)
 Master Manjunath as Chottey
 Loknath as Jaya's father
 Udaya Kumar as Aparna's father
 Kamani Dharan as Jaya's mother
 Tara Mallya as Kallesh's mother
 Upasane Seetharam as Neighbor

Soundtrack
The music of the film was composed by G. K. Venkatesh and lyrics by Chi. Udayashankar and Sri Purandaradasaru.

References

External links 

1980s Kannada-language films
1983 films
Films scored by G. K. Venkatesh
Films directed by Shankar Nag